Michelangelo Antonioni  (29 September 1912 – 30 July 2007) was an Italian director and filmmaker. He is best known for his "trilogy on modernity and its discontents"—L'Avventura (1960), La Notte (1961), and L'Eclisse (1962)—as well as the English-language film Blow-up (1966). His films have been described as "enigmatic and intricate mood pieces" that feature elusive plots, striking visual composition, and a preoccupation with modern landscapes. His work substantially influenced subsequent art cinema. Antonioni received numerous awards and nominations throughout his career, being the only director to have won the Palme d'Or, the Golden Lion, the Golden Bear and the Golden Leopard.

Early life 

Antonioni was born into a prosperous family of landowners in Ferrara, Emilia Romagna, in northern Italy. He was the son of Elisabetta (née Roncagli) and Ismaele Antonioni. The director explained to Italian film critic Aldo Tassone:

As a child, Antonioni was fond of drawing and music. A precocious violinist, he gave his first concert at the age of nine. Although he abandoned the violin with the discovery of cinema in his teens, drawing would remain a lifelong passion. "I have never drawn, even as a child, either puppets or silhouettes but rather facades of houses and gates. One of my favourite games consisted of organizing towns. Ignorant in architecture, I constructed buildings and streets crammed with little figures. I invented stories for them. These childhood happenings—I was eleven years old—were like little films."

Upon graduation from the University of Bologna with a degree in economics, he started writing for the local Ferrara newspaper Il Corriere Padano in 1935 as a film journalist.

In 1940, Antonioni moved to Rome, where he worked for Cinema, the official Fascist film magazine edited by Vittorio Mussolini. However, Antonioni was fired a few months afterwards. Later that year he enrolled at the Centro Sperimentale di Cinematografia to study film technique but left after three months. He was subsequently drafted into the army. During the war Antonioni survived being condemned to death as a member of the Italian resistance.

Career

Early film work 

In 1942, Antonioni co-wrote A Pilot Returns with Roberto Rossellini and worked as assistant director on Enrico Fulchignoni's I due Foscari. In 1943, he travelled to France to assist Marcel Carné on Les visiteurs du soir and then began a series of short films with Gente del Po (1943), a story of poor fishermen of the Po valley. When Rome was liberated by the Allies, the film stock was transferred to the Fascist "Republic of Salò" and could not be recovered and edited until 1947 (the complete footage was never retrieved). These films were neorealist in style, being semi-documentary studies of the lives of ordinary people.

However, Antonioni's first full-length feature film Cronaca di un amore (1950) broke away from neorealism by depicting the middle classes. He continued to do so in a series of other films: I vinti ("The Vanquished", 1952), a trio of stories, each set in a different country (France, Italy and England), about juvenile delinquency; La signora senza camelie (The Lady Without Camellias, 1953) about a young film star and her fall from grace; and Le amiche (The Girlfriends, 1955) about middle-class women in Turin. Il grido (The Outcry, 1957) was a return to working class stories, depicting a factory worker and his daughter. Each of these stories is about social alienation.

International recognition 

In Le Amiche (1955), Antonioni experimented with a radical new style: instead of a conventional narrative, he presented a series of apparently disconnected events, and he used long takes as part of his film making style. Antonioni returned to their use in L'avventura (1960), which became his first international success. At the Cannes Film Festival it received a mixture of cheers and boos, but the film was popular in art house cinemas around the world. La notte (1961), starring Jeanne Moreau and Marcello Mastroianni, and L'Eclisse (1962), starring Alain Delon, followed L'avventura. These three films are commonly referred to as a trilogy because they are stylistically similar and all concerned with the alienation of man in the modern world.
La notte won the Golden Bear award at the 11th Berlin International Film Festival, His first color film, Il deserto rosso (The Red Desert, 1964), deals with similar themes, and is sometimes considered the fourth film of the "trilogy". All of these films star Monica Vitti, his lover during that period.

Antonioni then signed a deal with producer Carlo Ponti that would allow artistic freedom on three films in English to be released by MGM. The first, Blowup (1966), set in Swinging London, was a major international success. The script was loosely based on the short story The Devil's Drool (otherwise known as Blow Up) by Argentinian writer Julio Cortázar. Although it dealt with the challenging theme of the impossibility of objective standards and the ever-doubtable truth of memory, it was a successful and popular hit with audiences, no doubt helped by its sex scenes, which were explicit for the time. It starred David Hemmings and Vanessa Redgrave. The second film was Zabriskie Point (1970), his first set in America and with a counterculture theme. The soundtrack featured music from Pink Floyd (who wrote new music specifically for the film), the Grateful Dead and the Rolling Stones. However, its release was a critical and commercial disaster. The third, The Passenger (1975), starring Jack Nicholson and Maria Schneider, received critical praise, but also did poorly at the box office. It was out of circulation for many years, but was re-released for a limited theatrical run in October 2005 and has subsequently been released on DVD.

In 1966, Antonioni drafted a treatment entitled "Technically Sweet", which he later developed into a screenplay with Mark Peploe, Niccolo Tucci, and Tonino Guerra, with plans to begin filming in the early '70's with actors Jack Nicholson and Maria Schneider.  On the verge of production in the Amazon jungle, the producer, Carlo Ponti, suddenly withdrew support and the project was abandoned, with Nicholson and Schneider going forward to star in The Passenger.  In 2008, "Technically Sweet", became an international group exhibition curated by Copenhagen-based artists Yvette Brackman and Maria Finn, in which the creations of several artists, working in multiple mediums and based on Antoniono's manuscript, were displayed in New York City. One of these was the short film "Sweet Ruin", directed by Elisabeth Subrin and starring Gaby Hoffmann.  Antonioni's widow Enrica and director André Ristum have announced plans to produce a feature film based on the screenplay, with filming in Brazil and Sardinia to begin in 2023.

In 1972, in between Zabriskie Point and The Passenger, Antonioni was invited by the Mao government of the People's Republic of China to visit the country. He made the documentary Chung Kuo, Cina, but it was severely denounced by the Chinese authorities as "anti-Chinese" and "anti-communist". The documentary had its first showing in China on 25 November 2004 in Beijing with a film festival hosted by the Beijing Film Academy to honour the works of Michelangelo Antonioni.

Later career 

In 1980, Antonioni made Il mistero di Oberwald (The Mystery of Oberwald), an experiment in the electronic treatment of color, recorded in video then transferred to film, featuring Monica Vitti once more. It is based on Jean Cocteau's play L'Aigle à deux têtes (The Eagle With Two Heads). Identificazione di una donna (Identification of a Woman, 1982), filmed in Italy, deals one more time with the recursive subjects of his Italian trilogy. In 1985, Antonioni suffered a stroke, which left him partly paralyzed and unable to speak. However, he continued to make films, including Beyond the Clouds (1995), for which Wim Wenders filmed some scenes. As Wenders has explained, Antonioni rejected almost all the material filmed by Wenders during the editing, except for a few short interludes. They shared the FIPRESCI Prize at the Venice Film Festival with Cyclo.

In 1994 he was given the Honorary Academy Award "in recognition of his place as one of the cinema's master visual stylists." It was presented to him by Jack Nicholson. Months later, the statuette was stolen by burglars and had to be replaced. Previously, he had been nominated for Academy Awards for Best Director and Best Screenplay for Blowup. Antonioni's final film, made when he was in his 90s, was a segment of the anthology film Eros (2004), entitled Il filo pericoloso delle cose (The Dangerous Thread of Things). The short film's episodes are framed by dreamy paintings and the song "Michelangelo Antonioni", composed and sung by Caetano Veloso. However, it was not well-received internationally; in America, for example, Roger Ebert claimed that it was neither erotic nor about eroticism. The U.S. DVD release of the film includes another 2004 short film by Antonioni, Lo sguardo di Michelangelo (The Gaze of Michelangelo).

Antonioni died at age 94 on 30 July 2007 in Rome, the same day that another renowned film director, Ingmar Bergman, also died. Antonioni lay in state at City Hall in Rome where a large screen showed black-and-white footage of him among his film sets and behind-the-scenes. He was buried in his hometown of Ferrara on 2 August 2007.

Style and themes 

Critic Richard Brody described Antonioni as "the cinema's exemplary modernist" and one of its "great pictorialists—his images reflect, with a cold enticement, the abstractions that fascinated him." AllMovie stated that "his films—a seminal body of enigmatic and intricate mood pieces—rejected action in favor of contemplation, championing image and design over character and story. Haunted by a sense of instability and impermanence, his work defined a cinema of possibilities." Stephen Dalton of the British Film Institute described Antonioni's influential visual hallmarks as "extremely long takes, striking modern architecture, painterly use of colour, [and] tiny human figures adrift in empty landscapes," noting similarities to the "empty urban dreamscapes" of surrealist painter Giorgio de Chirico. Film historian Virginia Wright Wexman notes the slowness of his camera and the absence of frequent cuts, stating that "he forces our full attention by continuing the shot long after others would cut away." Antonioni is also noted for exploiting colour as a significant expressive element in his later works, especially in Il deserto rosso, his first colour film.

Antonioni's plots were experimental, ambiguous, and elusive, often featuring middle-class characters who suffer from ennui, desperation, or joyless sex. Film historian David Bordwell writes that in Antonioni's films, "Vacations, parties and artistic pursuits are vain efforts to conceal the characters' lack of purpose and emotion. Sexuality is reduced to casual seduction, enterprise to the pursuit of wealth at any cost." The New Yorker wrote that "Antonioni captured a new bourgeois society that shifted from physical to intellectual creation, from matter to abstraction, from things to images, and the crisis of personal identity and self-recognition that resulted," calling his 1960s collaborations with Monica Vitti "a crucial moment in the creation of cinematic modernism." Richard Brody stated that his films explore "the way that new methods of communication—mainly the mass media, but also the abstractions of high-tech industry, architecture, music, politics, and even fashion—have a feedback effect on the educated, white-collar thinkers who create them," but noted that "he wasn’t nostalgic about the premodern."

Wexman describes Antonioni's perspective on the world as that of a "postreligious Marxist and existentialist intellectual." In a speech at Cannes about L'Avventura, Antonioni said that in the modern age of reason and science, mankind still lives by "a rigid and stereotyped morality which all of us recognize as such and yet sustain out of cowardice and sheer laziness [...] We have examined those moral attitudes very carefully, we have dissected them and analyzed them to the point of exhaustion. We have been capable of all this, but we have not been capable of finding new ones." Nine years later he expressed a similar attitude in an interview, saying that he loathed the word 'morality': "When man becomes reconciled to nature, when space becomes his true background, these words and concepts will have lost their meaning, and we will no longer have to use them." Critic Roland Barthes claimed that Antonioni's approach "is not that of a historian, a politician or a moralist, but rather that of a utopian whose perception is seeking to pinpoint the new world, because he is eager for this world and already wants to be part of it." He added that his art "consists in always leaving the road of meaning open and as if undecided."

Reception and legacy 

Bordwell explains that Antonioni was extremely influential on subsequent art films: "More than any other director, he encouraged filmmakers to explore elliptical and open-ended narrative." The Guardian described him as, "in essence, a director of extraordinary sequences," and advised viewers to "forget plotting, characters or dialogue, his import is conveyed in absolutely formal terms."

Film director Akira Kurosawa considered Antonioni one of the most interesting filmmakers. Stanley Kubrick listed La Notte as one of his ten favorite films in a 1963 Poll. Miklós Jancsó considers Antonioni as his master. American director Martin Scorsese paid tribute to Antonioni following his death in 2007, stating that his films "posed mysteries—or rather the mystery, of who we are, what we are, to each other, to ourselves, to time. You could say that Antonioni was looking directly at the mysteries of the soul." American directors Francis Ford Coppola and Brian De Palma paid homage to Antonioni in their own films.

Antonioni's spare style and purposeless characters, however, have not received universal acclaim. Ingmar Bergman stated in 2002 that while he considered the Antonioni films Blowup and La notte masterpieces, he found the other films boring and noted that he had never understood why Antonioni was held in such esteem. Orson Welles regretted the Italian director's use of the long take: "I don't like to dwell on things. It's one of the reasons I'm so bored with Antonioni—the belief that, because a shot is good, it's going to get better if you keep looking at it. He gives you a full shot of somebody walking down a road. And you think, 'Well, he's not going to carry that woman all the way up that road.' But he does. And then she leaves and you go on looking at the road after she's gone."

American actor Peter Weller, whom Antonioni directed in Beyond the Clouds, explained in a 1996 interview: "There is no director living except maybe Kurosawa, Bergman, or Antonioni that I would fall down and do anything for. I met Antonioni three years ago in Taormina at a film festival. I introduced myself and told him that I adored his movies, his contributions to film, because he was the first guy who really started making films about the reality of the vacuity between people, the difficulty in traversing this space between lovers in modern day ... and he never gives you an answer, Antonioni—that's the beautiful thing."

Filmography

Feature films

Short films 
 Gente del Po (People of the Po Valley, filmed in 1943, released in 1947) – 10 minutes
 N.U. (Dustmen, 1948) – 11 minutes
 Oltre l'oblio (1948)
 Roma-Montevideo (1948)
 Lies of Love (L'amorosa menzogna, 1949) – 10 minutes
 Sette canne, un vestito (Seven Reeds, One Suit, 1949) – 10 minutes
 Bomarzo (1949)
 Ragazze in bianco (Girls in White, 1949)
 Superstizione (Superstition, 1949) – 9 minutes
 La villa dei mostri (The House of Monsters, 1950) – 10 minutes
 La funivia del Faloria (The Funicular of Mount Faloria, 1950) – 10 minutes
 Tentato suicido (When Love Fails, 1953) – episode in L'amore in città (Love in the City)
 Il provino (1965) – episode in I tre volti 
 Inserto girato a Lisca Bianca (1983) – 8 minutes
 Kumbha Mela (1989) – 18 minutes
 Roma (Rome, 1989) – episode in 12 registi per 12 città, for the 1990 FIFA World Cup
 Noto, Mandorli, Vulcano, Stromboli, Carnevale (Volcanoes and Carnival, 1993) – 8 minutes
 Sicilia (1997) – 9 minutes
 Lo sguardo di Michelangelo (The Gaze of Michelangelo, 2004) – 15 minutes
 Il filo pericoloso delle cose (The Dangerous Thread of Things, 2004) – episode in Eros

Awards and honors 
 Academy Honorary Award (1995)
 Berlin International Film Festival FIPRESCI Prize (1961)
 Berlin International Film Festival Golden Bear (1961), for La Notte
 Bodil Award for Best European Film (1976), for The Passenger
 British Film Institute Sutherland Trophy (1960), for L'Avventura
 Cannes Film Festival Jury Prize (1960), for L'Avventura
 Cannes Film Festival Jury Prize (1962), for Eclipse
 Cannes Film Festival Palme d'Or (1967), for Blowup
 Cannes Film Festival 35th Anniversary Prize (1982), for Identification of a Woman
 David di Donatello Award for Best Director (1961), for La Notte
 David di Donatello Luchino Visconti Award (1976)
 European Film Awards Life Achievement Award (1993)
 Flaiano Prize Career Award in Cinema (2000)
 French Syndicate of Cinema Critics Award for Best Foreign Film (1968), for Blowup
 Giffoni Film Festival François Truffaut Award (1991)
 Giffoni Film Festival Golden Career Gryphon (1995)
 International Istanbul Film Festival Lifetime Achievement Award (1996)
 Italian National Syndicate of Film Journalists Silver Ribbon for Best Documentary (1948), for N.U.
 Italian National Syndicate of Film Journalists Silver Ribbon for Best Documentary (1950), for Lies of Love
 Italian National Syndicate of Film Journalists Special Silver Ribbon (1951), for Story of a Love Affair
 Italian National Syndicate of Film Journalists Silver Ribbon for Best Director (1956), for Le Amiche
 Italian National Syndicate of Film Journalists Silver Ribbon for Best Director (1962), for La Notte
 Italian National Syndicate of Film Journalists Silver Ribbon for Best foreign film Director (1968), for Blow up
 Italian National Syndicate of Film Journalists Silver Ribbon for Best Director (1976), for The Passenger
 Kansas City Film Critics Circle Award for Best Director (1968), for Blowup
 Locarno International Film Festival Prize (1957), for Il Grido
 Montreal World Film Festival Grand Prix Special des Amériques (1995)
 National Society of Film Critics Special Citation Award (2001)
 National Society of Film Critics Award for Best Director (2001), for Blowup
 Palm Springs International Film Festival Lifetime Achievement Award (1998)
 Valladolid International Film Festival FIPRESCI Prize for Short Film (2004), for Michelangelo Eye to Eye
 Venice Film Festival Silver Lion (1955), for Le Amiche
 Venice Film Festival FIPRESCI Prize (1964), for Red Desert
 Venice Film Festival Golden Lion (1964), for Red Desert
 Venice Film Festival Career Golden Lion (1983)
 Venice Film Festival FIPRESCI Prize (1995), for Beyond the Clouds (with Wim Wenders)
 Venice Film Festival Pietro Bianchi Award (1998)

References

Citations

Bibliography

External links 

 
 
 
 Michelangelo Antonioni Antonioni writings and interviews
 Michelangelo Antonioni Bibliography in the University of California, Berkeley Library

1912 births
2007 deaths
Academy Honorary Award recipients
Centro Sperimentale di Cinematografia alumni
University of Bologna alumni
David di Donatello winners
Ciak d'oro winners
Directors of Palme d'Or winners
Directors of Golden Bear winners
European Film Awards winners (people)
Italian film directors
Italian-language film directors
Italian Marxists
Italian music video directors
Nastro d'Argento winners
People from Ferrara
Italian male screenwriters
20th-century Italian screenwriters
Knights Grand Cross of the Order of Merit of the Italian Republic